The Arrondissement of Verviers is one of the four administrative arrondissements in the Walloon province of Liège, Belgium. It includes all the 9 municipalities of the German-speaking Community (about 1/4 of population), while the remaining 20 municipalities in the Arrondissement of Verviers are part of the French-speaking Community.

The Administrative Arrondissement of Verviers consists of the following municipalities:

 Amel
 Aubel
 Baelen
 Büllingen
 Burg-Reuland
 Bütgenbach
 Dison
 Eupen
 Herve
 Jalhay

 Kelmis
 Lierneux
 Limbourg
 Lontzen
 Malmedy
 Olne
 Pepinster
 Plombières
 Raeren
 Sankt Vith

 Spa
 Stavelot
 Stoumont
 Theux
 Thimister-Clermont
 Trois-Ponts
 Verviers
 Waimes
 Welkenraedt

References

Verviers